The 2019–20 Baylor Bears basketball team were represented by Baylor University in the  2019–20 NCAA Division I men's basketball season.  The Bears were led by 17th-year head coach Scott Drew and played their games at the Ferrell Center in Waco, Texas as members of the Big 12 Conference.

Previous season
The Bears finished the 2018–19 season 20–14 overall and 10–8 in Big 12 play, finishing in fourth place. As the No. 4 seed in the Big 12 tournament, they were defeated by Iowa State in the quarterfinals. They received a no. 9 seed the NCAA tournament where they defeated Syracuse in the first round before losing to Gonzaga in the second round.

Offseason

Departures

Incoming transfers

2019 recruiting class

2020 Recruiting class

Roster

Schedule and results
Source

|-
!colspan=12 style=| Regular season

|-
!colspan=12 style=| Big 12 tournament
|- style="background:#bbbbbb"
| style="text-align:center"|Mar 12, 20206:00 pm, ESPN2
| style="text-align:center"| (2)  No. 5
| vs. (10) Kansas StateQuarterfinals
| colspan=5 rowspan=1 style="text-align:center"|Cancelled due to the COVID-19 pandemic
| style="text-align:center"|Sprint CenterKansas City, MO

Rankings

*AP does not release post-NCAA tournament rankings.

References

Baylor
Baylor Bears men's basketball seasons
Baylor Bears basketball team
Baylor Bears basketball team